The  was a coastal defense gun and  heavy artillery used by the Imperial Japanese Army during the World War II.  The designation Type 45 indicates the year of its introduction, the 45th year of the Meiji period or 1912 according to the Gregorian calendar.

Design 

The Type 45 was a built-up gun made from steel with an interrupted-screw breech which fired separate loading cased charges and projectiles.  The barrel was trunnioned near its center, with a gun shield to protect the gun crew and a hydro-spring recoil system above the barrel.  Although classified as a heavy field artillery piece and coastal defense gun by the Imperial Japanese Army, in reality, it was only used as a coastal defense gun because no gun carriage was provided for transport.  In order to emplace the gun, a pit needed to be excavated and a concrete apron laid to support the mount.  As originally built the Type 45 was intended for a direct fire role with a maximum elevation of +30° and was probably capable of firing a projectile farther than what its optical fire direction equipment could accurately target.  A modification program in 1934 increased its maximum elevation to +43° which increased its range and gave it an indirect fire capability.

History 
During the 1920s the Type 45 was augmented but never replaced by the Type 7 15 cm coast defense gun.  Both the Type 45 and Type 7 used the same projectiles.  At that same time large numbers of naval guns were declared surplus and placed in storage for use as coastal defense guns when the ships they armed were scrapped due to the Washington Naval Disarmament Treaties.  This glut of suitable coastal defense guns meant that the Type 45 and Type 7 were only produced in limited numbers during the 1920s.  Due to the type 45's weight, few numbers and limited mobility, it saw only limited use outside of the Japanese home islands and against land targets.

References

External links
 Taki's Imperial Japanese Army Page

150 mm artillery
Coastal artillery
World War I artillery of Japan
World War II artillery of Japan